Crossocerus palmipes  is a Palearctic species of solitary wasp.

References

External links
 Images representing Crossocerus palmipes

Hymenoptera of Europe
Crabronidae
Insects described in 1767
Taxa named by Carl Linnaeus